The Paris North Stars were a minor league baseball team that played in the East Texas League in 1924. Based in Paris, Texas, the team was managed by Bill Byers and Rollie Zeider and featured future Major League Baseball players Lloyd Brown and Alex Metzler.

References

Paris, Texas
Defunct minor league baseball teams
Defunct baseball teams in Texas
Baseball teams established in 1924
Baseball teams disestablished in 1924
1924 establishments in Texas
1924 disestablishments in Texas
East Texas League teams